Bathynectes piperitus is a species of crab in the family Polybiidae. It is found in Angola, Cabinda, Cape Verde, Fao Fishing Area, Gabon, Ghana, Guinea, Guinea-Bissau, Ivory Coast, Liberia, Senegal, and West Africa.

References

Further reading

 
 
 
 

Decapods
Crustaceans described in 1981
Taxa named by Raymond B. Manning
Taxa named by Lipke Holthuis